Luv U Soniyo is a 2013 Hindi romance film directed by Joe Rajan and produced by Viacom 18, Harsh Jain Beena Hemanshu Mehta and Joe Rajan. Creative Producers – Gautam Buragohain, Shivkumar Parthasarathy. Cinematography by Kalpesh Bhandarkar. Mark and Soniyo, who after having been brought together by fate have to win over their parents consent. Their cultures clash in every possible way and just when fate decides to turn the game around, all they have is their faith in each other and a little help from their friends.
The film features Tanuj Virwani and Neha Hinge as main characters.

Cast

Tanuj Virwani as Mark Briganza
Neha Hinge as Soniyo
Bunty Grewal as Vikram 
Aaditya Shivkumar
Daniyal Malik
Vivek Vaswani
Howard Rosemeyer
Suresh Menon
Farida Dadi
Tarak Miah
Avtar Gill as Neha's Dad
 Apurva Ratan as Babloo
 Arbab Umar as Bunty(Neha's cousin brother)

Songs
"Tumsa Nahi Koi" – KK, Anwesha Sarkar
"Pyar Tera" – Sonu Nigam
"Luv U Soniyo" – Remo Fernandes
"Chalo Chalte Hai Mexico" – Shaan
"You're My Valentine" – Sonu Nigam, Joy, Sunidhi Chauhan
"Palko Pe Phool" – Shaan, Shreya Ghoshal
"Pyar Tera" (Unplugged) – Sonu Nigam

References
 https://www.imdb.com/title/tt2188811/fullcredits?ref_=tt_ov_st_sm

External links
 
 

2010s Hindi-language films
Indian romantic musical films
2013 films
Viacom18 Studios films
2010s romantic musical films